Alejandro L. Doherty Horan (born August 6, 1965) is a former field hockey player from Argentina. He competed for his native country at the 1996 Summer Olympics, where he finished in ninth place with the national squad. He made his Olympic debut at the 1988 Summer Olympics.

References
 
 santafedeportivo

External links
 

1965 births
Living people
Argentine male field hockey players
Field hockey players at the 1988 Summer Olympics
Field hockey players at the 1996 Summer Olympics
Olympic field hockey players of Argentina
Pan American Games gold medalists for Argentina
Pan American Games silver medalists for Argentina
Argentine people of Irish descent
Pan American Games medalists in field hockey
Field hockey players at the 1991 Pan American Games
Field hockey players at the 1995 Pan American Games
Field hockey players at the 1987 Pan American Games
1990 Men's Hockey World Cup players
Medalists at the 1995 Pan American Games
Medalists at the 1987 Pan American Games
Medalists at the 1991 Pan American Games
20th-century Argentine people